Thomas Magwood (March 28, 1851 – December 15, 1933) was an Ontario farmer and political figure. He represented Perth North in the Legislative Assembly of Ontario as a Conservative member from 1891 to 1898.

He was born in East Flamborough Township, Wentworth County, Canada West in 1851. He served on the township council for Mornington. In 1881, he married Elizabeth Magwood. He was elected in an 1890 by-election held after the election of Alfred Emanuel Ahrens was declared invalid. He died in 1933.

References

External links

1851 births
1933 deaths
Progressive Conservative Party of Ontario MPPs